Bucker may refer to:
 A logging worker who performs log bucking
 George Bucker or Adam Damlip (died c. 1540), English Protestant martyr
 Koen Bucker (born 1996), Dutch footballer

See also
Bücker (disambiguation)